Qarah Dash (also Romanized as Qarah Dāsh and Qareh Dāsh) is a village in Zeberkhan Rural District, Zeberkhan District, Nishapur County, Razavi Khorasan Province, Iran. At the 2006 census, its population was 282, in 70 families.

References 

Populated places in Nishapur County